Samuel Harris Hoge (April 6, 1860 – March 21, 1947) was an American attorney and Republican politician who served one term in the Virginia House of Delegates.

Early and family life

He was born in Montgomery County, Virginia on April 6, 1860 to Daniel Howe Hoge (1811-1867) and his wife, the former Anne Hawes DeJarnette of Caroline County(1824-1876), and had at least three elder brothers and two sisters.

On October 2, 1889, Hoge married Katherine Craig Taylor (1870-1956), whose father James Craig Taylor (1826-1887) had served in both houses of the Virginia General Assembly as well as Attorney General of Virginia after the American Civil War. Their son Samuel Harris Hoge Jr. (1893-1941) did not survive his parents, but their daughters did: Caroline H. Hoge, Barbara H. Hoge, Katherine D. Hoge.

Career

Hoge was admitted to the Virginia bar, and also served as postmaster.

He served one term in the Virginia House of Delegates, representing Patrick County, Virginia beginning December 2, 1885 (replacing Abram F. Mays and being replaced by Edmund Parr, who would serve many terms). Hoge later moved his legal practice to Roanoke.

Hoge was the Republican nominee for Governor of Virginia in 1925. He lost the general election to state senator Harry F. Byrd, who was transforming the Democratic political machine formerly headed by the late U.S. Senator Thomas S. Martin into the Byrd Organization, which would hold power in the Commonwealth for the next three decades.

Death and legacy

Samuel Hoge Sr. died on March 21, 1947 at Roanoke's Jefferson Hospital of complications after a stroke, survived by his wife and daughters. He is buried in Roanoke's Fair View Cemetery.

References

External links
 
 

1860 births
1947 deaths
Republican Party members of the Virginia House of Delegates
19th-century American politicians
20th-century American politicians
People from Montgomery County, Virginia
People from Patrick County, Virginia
People from Roanoke, Virginia